Việt Điện U Linh Tập is a collection of Vietnamese history written in Chinese (chữ nho) compiled by Lý Tế Xuyên in 1329.

The English "Viet Realm" (or "Yue Territory") derives from alternative Chinese characters designating Vietnam under the Chinese domination as Jiaozhi. Chinese sources tend to use the Chinese title Yuedian (粵甸, Yue as in Nanyue) whereas Vietnamese sources tend to use the title Việt Điện (越甸). The use differs in selection of different chữ Hán characters for Viet/Yue. The text gives not only a commentated history of historical figures, but also their roles as spirits in the afterlife according to the traditions developed in Vietnam's Mahayana Buddhism. The text also cited from contributions of Tang dynasty author Zhao Chang (fl. 791–802) and Zeng Gun (f. 866–897) who ruled Protectorate General to Pacify the South (northern Vietnam).

See also
Lĩnh Nam chích quái

References

Bibliography
  
  

 
 

Trần dynasty texts
Vietnamese books
History books about Vietnam
Vietnamese short story collections
Chinese-language literature of Vietnam